Ipomoea calobra, commonly known as weir vine, is an Australian native plant found in northern Australia, largely Western Australia and Queensland.

Description
It is a climber growing up to 6 m high, with purple-blue-pink trumpet flowers from January to June.

Habitat
It occurs on undulating plains, dunes, and hardpans in red sandy and clayey soils, and pebbly loam, and is often found twined up mulga and other acacias.

Uses
The tubers of this species are edible, and were a highly favoured staple food source (bush tucker) for Indigenous Australians. The mature tubers are broadly similar nutritionally to sweet potato (Ipomoea batatas), with higher concentrations of starch, potassium (K), copper (Cu) and zinc (Zn).

Aboriginal names
In some parts of Australia, I. calobra is also known to Aboriginal people by the following names:

Murchison-Gascoyne area (WA): kulyu
Tjupan Ngalia group (Leonora, WA): wutha/wather

References 

Solanales of Australia
Bushfood
Australian Aboriginal bushcraft
costata
Eudicots of Western Australia
Flora of the Northern Territory
Flora of Queensland
Taxa named by Ferdinand von Mueller